Calvin Datze Sun (born November 20, 1986) is an American emergency room doctor. He is the founder and CEO of the travel company, The Monsoon Diaries. Sun is notable for his first-hand reporting on the COVID-19 pandemic in New York City emergency rooms.

Early life and education
Sun was born in New York City. His parents came from China separately, meeting in New York City. His father came via Taiwan, but was from the Hunan region of China. In 2006, after Sun's father died from a heart attack, Sun discovered a camera lens, which inspired him to travel and take pictures using the lens. Sun's mother has Parkinson's disease.

In 2008, Sun graduated with a B.A. in biochemistry on a pre-med track from Columbia University. While at sophomore at Columbia, Sun was a research assistant to molecular biologist Dr. Richard Axel at the Columbia University Medical Center. In 2014, Sun received an M.D. from SUNY Downstate College of Medicine where he specialized in emergency medicine and completed four years of residency at Jacobi/Montefiore Emergency Medicine Residency Program of the Albert Einstein College of Medicine.

Career

Medicine
Sun works as an attending physician and clinical assistant professor in Emergency Medicine at multiple emergency departments in the New York City area.

COVID-19
During the COVID-19 pandemic, Sun is working as a per diem emergentologist, rotating among different hospitals in New York City during the height of the early days of the pandemic. During this time, Sun did first person reporting of his experiences and his thoughts on how the disease manifests itself on his Instagram. He also gave many interviews to media outlets in the United States and abroad, and with interviewers like Katy Tur from MSNBC, Willie Geist from The TODAY Show

In his interview with Katie Couric, he likened working on the front-lines of the pandemic to being like going to war every day. Sun discussed his initial concerns with national shortages of ventilators and personal protective equipment (PPE), issues with cross-contamination in crowded ER rooms, the importance of testing and staying home in the interest of public safety. Both of Sun's grandparents (who lived separately from him) contracted COVID-19 within their communities where his grandfather died of the disease shortly after contracting the virus.

The Monsoon Diaries

In 2010 while beginning medical school, Sun began to document his international travels in an online photo blog called The Monsoon Diaries. In 2011, Sun traveled to North Korea where he was one of the first foreigners to photograph and document his experience of accidentally discovering the mysterious hidden 5th floor of the Yanggakdo International Hotel, the largest hotel in North Korea. The 5th floor is a source of curiosity among many foreigners because it is off-limits to hotel guests.

Around Winter 2012, as a way to organize the emerging ad hoc accidental travel blog turned community of fellow travelers, Sun turned his blog into a travel company so that participants can travel in spontaneously formed groups on budget-conscious loosely structured and last minute short trips while still being able to work full-time jobs and be in school full-time as Sun was still was at the time.

Filmmaking
In July 2007, Sun's short film, Asian American Beauty: A Discourse on Female Body Image, won the One to Watch Award at the 30th Asian American International Film Festival in New York City.

Book 
2022: The Monsoon Diaries: A Doctor’s Journey of Hope and Healing from the ER Frontlines to the Far Reaches of the World, Harper Horizon, Sep 27, 2022 - Biography & Autobiography - 224 pages

Membership
 2004-2005: Columbia University, Class Representative
 2004-2015: East Coast Asian American Student Union, Board of Directors
 2005-2006: Columbia University, Director of Intercouncil Affairs
 2006-2007: Columbia University, Director of Campus Events
 2006-2008: Columbia University, Class Vice President
 2007: Day Out Against Hate on Low Plaza, Co-organizer
 2007-2008: Columbia College, Columbia College Student Council (CCSC), Vice President
 2010-2014: SUNY Downstate College of Medicine, Class President
 Columbia University Asian American Alliance, President
 Columbia College Young Alumni (CCYA), President
 Columbia University National Undergraduate Film Festival, Founder and President
 Columbia University Office of Multicultural Affairs, Advisory Board Member

Honors 
 2004: National Interscholastic Swim Coaches of America (NISCA), All-American Swimmer
 2008: Columbia University, Dean's Pin

Selected works and publications

Selected works

Selected publications

Filmography

 2015: TEDTalk TEDxLehighU: Take the Path of More Resistance

References

External links

 
 The Monsoon Diaries
 Calvin Sun at Mount Sinai Hospital
 

1986 births
Columbia College (New York) alumni
Trinity School (New York City) alumni
American emergency physicians
SUNY Downstate Medical Center alumni
American film directors of Taiwanese descent
MTV people
Icahn School of Medicine at Mount Sinai faculty
Living people